The Women's team sprint at the 2012 UCI Track Cycling World Championships was held on April 4. 16 nations of 2 cyclists each participated in the contest. After the qualifying, the fastest 2 teams raced for gold, and 3rd and 4th teams raced for bronze.

Medalists

Results

Qualifying
The qualifying was held at 19:00.

Lithuania - "For drawing away by more than 15 meters before the end of the lap that he is to lead Art. 3.2.153"

Finals 
The finals were held at 20:05.

Small Final

Final

References

2012 UCI Track Cycling World Championships
UCI Track Cycling World Championships – Women's team sprint